Lethrinops argenteus is a species of cichlid endemic to Lake Malawi.  This species grows to a length of  TL.

References

argenteus
Taxa named by Ernst Ahl
Fish described in 1926
Taxonomy articles created by Polbot